Mounir Jelili (11 June 1949 – 24 January 2023) was a Tunisian handball player. He was a member of the Tunisia men's national handball team. He was part of the  team at the 1972 Summer Olympics playing one match and at the 1976 Summer Olympics. On club level he played for Espérance ST in Tunis.

Mounir Jelili was the older brother of handballer Mohamed Naceur Jelili who also competed for the Tunisian team at the 1972 and 1976 Summer Olympics.

Jelili died on 24 January 2023, at the age of 73.

References

1949 births
2023 deaths
20th-century Tunisian people
21st-century Tunisian people
Handball players at the 1972 Summer Olympics
Tunisian male handball players
Handball players at the 1976 Summer Olympics
Olympic handball players of Tunisia
Place of birth missing